Martin McCauley may refer to:

 Martin McCauley, one of the Colombia Three
 Martin McCauley (historian) (born 1934), British historian